James Ivey is an artist and musician from Texas residing in San Diego, California. He is known for having a Surreal art style he calls Carnival Surrealism. He is known for having very nonchalant work.
He uses all oil based paints, and usually has very bright work, which may seem unusual, considering the materials.

Growing up in Houston, Texas, James was in numerous punk and hardcore bands including the "Charlie Brown Experience" and "Cactus Flower Daydream". In Houston, Texas James co-founded dark-wave gloom punk band "Premonition" who was signed to Siren Records. Premonition released a self-titled album to critical acclaim followed by constant touring.

In the recent past James has had a recording project using the name "peyote67". The music can be described as cinematic experimental electro-punk utilizing guitars, analog keyboards, found metal objects, contact mics, vintage and new effects. 

Currently, James has a recording project called "The Dirty Sun" which can be described as dark wave, industrial, glitch, no wave, electro punk, lo-fi shoe gaze, which relies heavier on guitars and vintage synthesizers with cold beats all recorded in his own "Dirty Moon Studios" in South Park, San Diego, CA.

Galleries
James Ivey has been featured in many galleries in San Diego, Los Angeles and New York.
Some galleries he has been featured in include (but are not limited to):
Forseti Gallery
Infusion Gallery- Collingswood, New Jersey
Distinction Gallery- Escondido
San Diego Air & Space Museum
Agni Zotis Gallery- Manhattan
Zedism- San Diego
Cannibal Flower- Los Angeles
Eclectix Gallery- San Francisco
APW Gallery- New York City
Jett Gallery- San Diego
Luis De Jesus Gallery- San Diego

Music

The Dirty Sun Music-

https://thedirtysun.bandcamp.com

Interview-

http://www.theblogthatcelebratesitself.blogspot.com/2015/05/white-noise-revisited-with-dirty-sun.html

Reviews-

http://www.theevenground.com/indie-music-album-reviews/the-dirty-sun-the-dirty-sun

Experimental music-

http://peyote67.com

References

"Cactus Pillow" James Ivey's Art Site
"Part Art Show" Part Art Show
"City Beat" City Beat (9/6/06)
"City Beat" City Beat (8/8/07)
"City of Escondido Full Story From 8/8/07 City Beat

Year of birth missing (living people)
Living people
Artists from San Diego